L'École secondaire catholique de Casselman is a French-Language Catholic high school located in Casselman, Ontario. It is managed by the Conseil scolaire de district catholique de l'Est ontarien.

French-language high schools in Ontario